Baring family properties is a listing of significant properties in England that were purchased or developed by members of the Baring family, mostly during the period 1820 to 1890.

The Baring family, established in England by German immigrant Johann (John) Baring (1697–1748), rose from moderate success in England during the 18th century to wealth and prominence in the 19th century and into the 20th. Following the common practice of wealthy European families, the Barings bought, rebuilt, remodeled, expanded and furnished lavish town houses and huge country estates. Many Barings were raised to the peerage in recognition of services rendered to the United Kingdom, and these estates became the seats of various baronets, barons and earls. After the Panic of 1890 nearly ruined Edward Baring, 1st Baron Revelstoke, along with several other family members and bank partners, the family's property holdings began to decrease. Most of the estates were long gone by the time the final crash of Barings Bank in 1995 claimed the bank's longtime headquarters at 8 Bishopsgate.

References

 P. Ziegler, The Sixth Great Power: The House of Barings, 1762–1929 (1988)

 Baring family properties